Pasinler is a town and district of Erzurum Province in the Eastern Anatolia region of Turkey. The mayor is Ünsal Sertoğlu (AKP). The population is 13,513 (as of 2010).

References

Populated places in Erzurum Province
Districts of Erzurum Province